William Ryan deGraffenried, Jr. (April 2, 1950 – December 7, 2006) served as President Pro Tempore of the Alabama State Senate from 1987 to 1995.

Early life and education 
DeGraffenried was born in Tuscaloosa, Alabama. He graduated from the University of Alabama and the Cumberland School of Law at Samford University.

Career 
DeGraffenried represented Tuscaloosa in the Alabama State Senate from 1978 until 1994 and served as the President Pro Tempore of the Senate, from 1987 until 1994. He was elected to the Senate in a special election when then-State Sen. Richard Shelby was elected to the U.S. House of Representatives to fill the vacancy of Walter Flowers.

After Governor H. Guy Hunt was removed from office due to criminal conviction, the Lieutenant Governor, Jim Folsom, Jr. became the new governor. DeGraffenried, as the President Pro Tempore of the state Senate, became next in line for the governorship for the remainder of the quadrennium.

DeGraffenried ran unsuccessfully for Lieutenant Governor in 1994, losing the Democratic primary to future Governor Don Siegelman. He then returned to practicing law in Tuscaloosa and later became a contract lobbyist.

Personal life 
His father, Ryan DeGraffenried, Sr., was also an Alabama politician.

He died unexpectedly of undisclosed natural causes in 2006 while attending a conference in Hoover, Alabama, aged 56.

References

Electoral history

Alabama Senate (16th district), 1982
 Ryan DeGraffenried (D) (inc.) - 20,149 (100.00%)

Alabama Senate (21st district), 1983
 Ryan DeGraffenried (D) (inc.) - 7,164 (100.00%)

Alabama Senate (21st district), 1986
 Ryan DeGraffenried (D) (inc.) - 23,101 (100.00%)

Alabama Senate (21st district), 1990
 Ryan DeGraffenried (D) (inc.) - 24,445 (100.00%)

Lieutenant Governor of Alabama (Democratic primary), 1994
 Don Siegelman - 273,621 (38.62%)
 Ryan DeGraffenried - 260,571 (36.78%)
 George Wallace, Jr. - 174,302 (24.60%)

Lieutenant Governor of Alabama (Democratic primary runoff), 1994
 Don Siegelman - 297,937 (57.32%)
 Ryan DeGraffenried - 221,877 (42.68%)

Source: OurCampaigns.com DeGraffenried page

1950 births
2006 deaths
Democratic Party Alabama state senators
Politicians from Tuscaloosa, Alabama
Place of birth missing
20th-century American politicians
Ryan